Syzygium oleosum, common names include blue lilly pilly, Scented satinash, and blue cherry. It is a species of Syzygium tree native to the eastern Australian rainforests and wet sclerophyll forests.

Description
It is usually a small tree, 4 to 15 m tall. The leaves are opposite, simple and lanceolate to ovate, with a dark glossy upper surface and paler under-surface. The leaves have oil dots and are distinctly aromatic when crushed, with aromas reminiscent of lemons. Its flowers are small and white-cream colored. It produces a purplish red fruit when young, changing to purplish blue when ripe, 13–40 mm in diameter.

Distribution
A wide distribution range on the east side of Australia. From Cooktown, North Queensland to the Illawarra, New South Wales.

Uses
The blue fruit can be eaten freshly picked from the tree or cooked. It has a pleasantly crisp texture and is mildly aromatic and sweet. The fruit can also be made into jams, jellies and wine. It is also grown as an ornamental plant.

References

oleosum
Trees of Australia
Ornamental trees
Myrtales of Australia
Flora of New South Wales
Flora of Queensland
Bushfood
Taxa named by Ferdinand von Mueller